The 2003 Women's Hockey RaboTrophy was the first edition of the women's field hockey tournament. The RaboTrophy was held in Amsterdam from 18 to 23 August 2003, and featured four of the top nations in women's field hockey.

Australia won the tournament for the first time, defeating the Netherlands 2–1 in the Final.

The tournament was held in conjunction with the Men's FIH Champions Trophy.

Competition format
The four teams competed in a pool stage, played in a single round robin format. At the conclusion of the pool stage, the top two teams contested the final, while the remaining teams played off for third place.

Teams
The following four teams competed for the title:

Officials
The following umpires were appointed by the International Hockey Federation to officiate the tournament:

 Renée Cohen (NED)
 Soledad Iparraguirre (ARG)
 Renaté Peters (GER)
 Minka Woolley (AUS)
 Kazuko Yasueda (JPN)

Results
All times are local (Central European Time).

Preliminary round

Fixtures

Classification round

Third and fourth place

Final

Awards

Statistics

Final standings

Goalscorers

References

External links
Official Website

RaboTrophy
Hockey RaboTrophy
Women's Hockey RaboTrophy
Hockey RaboTrophy
Sports competitions in Amstelveen